Will Brodie (born 23 August 1998) is a professional Australian rules footballer playing for the Fremantle Football Club in the Australian Football League (AFL), having been initially drafted to the Gold Coast Suns.

Early career

He grew up in Shepparton before accepting a scholarship to attend Scotch College, Melbourne. He was drafted by Gold Coast with their third selection and ninth overall in the 2016 national draft.

AFL career

He made his debut in the thirty-five point loss against  at TIO Traeger Park in round ten of the 2017 season.

Brodie started to find some consistency with his football early in the 2019 AFL season, however, a hamstring injury caused him to miss the remainder of the year. Brodie played the first round of the 2020 AFL season but the Covid-19 related shutdown of the competition saw him out of the side and unable to break back in that season.

Brodie played five games for Gold Coast in 2021. Brodie played every game of the 2022 season a career best and established himself as an important part of Fremantle's midfield.

Statistics
 Statistics are correct to the end of round 22 2022

|- style=background:#EAEAEA
| scope=row | 2017 ||  || 7
| 3 || 0 || 1 || 20 || 21 || 41 || 7 || 18 || 0.0 || 0.3 || 6.6 || 7.0 || 13.6 || 2.3 || 0.3
|-
| scope=row | 2018 ||  || 7
| 8 || 1 || 1 || 62 || 89 || 151 || 18 || 34 || 0.1 || 0.1 || 7.7 || 11.1 || 18.8 || 2.2 || 4.2 
|- style=background:#EAEAEA
| scope=row | 2019 ||  || 7
| 8 || 2 || 1 || 77 || 97 || 174 || 34 || 44 || 0.2 || 0.1 || 9.6 || 12.1 || 21.7 || 4.2 || 5.5 
|-
| scope=row | 2020 ||  || 7
| 1 || 0 || 0 || 4 || 10 || 14 || 3 || 1 || 0.0 || 0.0 || 4.0 || 10.0 || 14.0 || 3.0 || 1.0 
|- style=background:#EAEAEA
| scope=row | 2021 ||  || 7
| 5 || 0 || 1 || 25 || 39 || 64 || 7 || 8 || 0.0 || 0.2 || 5.0 || 7.8 || 12.8 || 1.4 || 1.6 
|-
| scope=row | 2022 ||  || 17
| 21 || 5 || 6 || 247 || 330 || 577 || 57 || 103 || 0.2 || 0.2 || 11.7 || 15.7 || 27.4 || 2.7 || 4.9
|- class=sortbottom
! colspan=3 | Career
! 46 !! 8 !! 10 !! 435 !! 586 !! 1021 !! 126 !! 208 !! 0.1 !! 0.2 !! 9.4 !! 12.7 !! 22.1 !! 2.7 !! 4.5
|}

Notes

References

External links

1998 births
Living people
Gold Coast Football Club players
Murray Bushrangers players
Australian rules footballers from Victoria (Australia)
People educated at Scotch College, Melbourne
Fremantle Football Club players
People from Shepparton